European Parliament elections were held in Denmark on 7 June 2009 to elect the 13 Danish members of the European Parliament. The election was held simultaneously with a referendum on changing the Danish Act of Succession.

Contesting parties
All Danish parties which were represented in the European Parliament announced they would take part in the election. These were the Social Democrats, Venstre (Liberal Party), Conservative People's Party, June Movement, Socialist People's Party, Danish People's Party, Social Liberal Party and the People's Movement against the EU.

As in the last election, several electoral coalitions were agreed to before the vote. The Social Democrats sided with the Social Liberal Party and the Socialist People's Party, while Venstre teamed up with the Conservative People's Party and Liberal Alliance. EU-critics JuniBevægelsen and the People's Movement against the EU were also in a coalition, meaning that the only party not in a coalition was the Danish People's Party.

Electoral system
Under the Danish electoral code for European Parliament elections, parties that surpassed the 2% threshold in the last Folketing elections may also take part in the European elections, should they wish so.

Opinion polls

Results

Elected members
The final list of MEP were determined by a recount of votes on individual politicians:

Social Democrats (4 seats)
Dan Jørgensen (233,266 votes)
Christel Schaldemose (43,855)
Britta Thomsen (32,569)
Ole Christensen (20,597)
Conservative People's Party (1 seat)
Bendt Bendtsen (176,786 votes)
Socialist People's Party (2 seats)
Margrete Auken (204,111 votes)
Emilie Turunen (37,330)
People's Movement against the EU (1 seat)
Søren Søndergaard (107,429 votes)
Danish People's Party (2 seats)
Morten Messerschmidt (284,500 votes)
Anna Rosbach Andersen (3,592)
Venstre (3 seats)
Jens Rohde (171,205 votes)
Morten Løkkegaard (57,175)
Anne Elisabet Jensen (47,906)

Aftermath
After the election, both head of the June Movement Keld Albrechtsen and lead candidate Hanne Dahl announced that they intended to disband the movement after failing to obtain a seat at the election.

References

Denmark
European Parliament elections in Denmark
Europe